Mäeküla is a village in Türi Parish, Järva County in central Estonia.

References

 

Villages in Järva County